Platform gap fillers are movable platform edge extensions at subway or railway stations where the curvature of the platform creates a significant gap between the platform and subway or train car door.

Hong Kong
Platform gap fillers were trialled on the platforms of Lo Wu station on the East Rail line in 2009 due to the difficulty of installing platform screen doors on the curved nature of the platforms. They were planned to be installed at other stations along the line along with signal upgrades. However, during the trial period, MTR found that the time taken for the gap filler to fully extend took 15-20 seconds and so greatly increased dwell times of trains. It was decided unsuitable for service. After the trial period ended in October 2009, the platform gap fillers were not used until it was finally removed during a platform-strengthening maintenance operation. Plans to install it on other stations of the East Rail line were also abandoned.

Japan 
Over 200 fillers are used in the Tokyo subway.

London Underground 
With the introduction of the NTfL, Transport for London are hoping to introduce platform gap fillers on the Bakerloo, Central & Piccadilly lines (of which 14 platforms have been identified for installation) at curved platforms such as Bank, where the gap between the train and the platform can exceed 1 foot.

New York City Subway

The Interborough Rapid Transit Company's first cars were built with only two doors on each side, at the extreme ends of the car, lining up with the curved platforms so as not to leave a wide gap between the train and the platform. When the IRT modified existing cars and ordered new cars with a middle door, gap fillers were needed because the middle door was not near the platform. After the City of New York bought the IRT in 1940, new car designs (starting with the R12) had the end doors away from the extreme ends of the car body, which also required the use of gap fillers at certain stations.

Stations equipped
IRT stations with gap fillers are:
 South Ferry, outer loop. The station closed on March 16, 2009 and was replaced by a new station which does not require gap fillers. After the latter station was damaged by flooding during Hurricane Sandy, the loop station was reopened as a temporary terminus on April 4, 2013. The 2009-era station reopened on June 27, 2017.
 Brooklyn Bridge – City Hall (IRT Lexington Avenue Line) originally had gap fillers on the express platforms. These were deactivated when the station was extended northward.  These gap fillers are still in place and can be seen just south of the current platforms.
 14th Street – Union Square (IRT Lexington Avenue Line) has gap fillers on both tracks on the downtown platform.  There may have been gap fillers on the uptown express platform. A new design of gap filler was installed in 2004 to provide maintenance access from the platform rather than requiring crews to stand at track level.
 Times Square (IRT 42nd Street Shuttle) had gap fillers on Shuttle tracks 1 and 3. They were mounted under the platform rather than on it, so they were not ADA accessible. They were removed in 2021 when the station was rebuilt.

Singapore 
Platform gap fillers are used in the Mass Rapid Transit system of Singapore, namely the North South MRT Line and the East West MRT Line. Platform gap fillers are also planned for installation on trains on the North East MRT Line and the Circle MRT Line as well, because newer trains can be equipped with gap fillers.

Germany
Many regional trains in Germany come with platform gap fillers, such as the Bombardier Talent 2. On subway networks, they have also become more common, as evidenced by the Nuremberg U-Bahn whose 1970s first generation VAG Class DT1 do not have them but whose VAG Class DT3 of the 2000s and 2010s and VAG Class G1 of the 2020s come equipped with automatic gap fillers.

See also

References

External links 

New York City Subway
Railway safety
Railway platforms
ja:ホームドア#車両とドア間の安全対策